The following is a series of books set in the fictional village of Prostokvashino created by Eduard Uspensky.

References 

Prostokvashino